Pseudobrienia is an extinct genus of beetles which existed in what is now Kazakhstan during the middle Late Jurassic epoch. It was described by A. A. Legalov in 2012, and the type species is P. rasnitsyni.

References 

Prehistoric beetle genera
Late Jurassic insects
Beetles described in 2012
Fossil taxa described in 2012
Prehistoric insects of Asia